Upper Defsko Lake is a mountain lake situated in the Šar Mountains at an elevation of  above sea level in Kosovo. A small stream originates from Upper Defsko Lake and flows south to join with the Radika river.

See also 
Lower Defsko Lake

Notes

References 

Šar Mountains
Lakes of Kosovo
Lakes of Serbia